Francesco II Sforza (February 4, 1495 – November 2, 1535) was Duke of Milan from 1521 until his death. He was the last member of the Sforza family to rule Milan.

He was the second son of Ludovico Sforza and Beatrice d'Este. When Ludovico was ousted from Milan in the course of the Italian Wars, he brought Francesco with him to the court of the Emperor Maximilian I, who had married a Sforza, Francesco's cousin Bianca Maria. Francesco was assigned to an ecclesiastical career. His father was imprisoned in Loches by Louis XII of France, and died in 1508, but when Charles V re-conquered Milan from the French in 1521, Francesco was appointed its duke, the last of the family to hold that title. His sovereignty, however, remained circumscribed by the military occupation of Milan by Spanish troops.

He returned to his state, depleted by twenty years of combat, promoting a cultural and economic recovery. Francesco fought at the Battle of Bicocca, on the side of the emperor, in 1522. In 1526 he switched sides, joining the League of Cognac, together with Francis I of France, Pope Clement VII and the Republic of Florence, and was besieged in the Castello Sforzesco.

On May 4, 1534 he married the 12-year-old niece of Charles V, Christina of Denmark, the daughter of Christian II of Denmark and Isabella of Burgundy. The union remained childless. His death in 1535 sparked the Italian War of 1535. His half-brother Giovanni Paolo reclaimed briefly the Duchy of Milan after his death, but died in the same year under mysterious circumstances.

Ancestry

Footnotes

References 
 Michael Mallett and Christine Shaw, The Italian Wars:1494-1559, Pearson Education Limited, 2012. 
 Charles Oman. A History of the Art of War in the Sixteenth Century.  London: Methuen & Co., 1937.
  Ernst Schulin. Kaiser Karl V: Geschichte eines übergroßen Wirkungsbereiches. Stuttgart: Kohlhammer Verlag, 1999. (German)

1495 births
1535 deaths
Francesco 2 Sforza
Francesco 2 Sforza
Military leaders of the Italian Wars
16th-century Italian nobility